Julio Gallo  (March 21, 1910 – May 2, 1993) was one of two of the founders of the E & J Gallo Winery.

Biography
He was born on March 21, 1910, in Oakland, California to Joseph Gallo, Sr. He had two brothers: his partner in the wine business, Ernest Gallo; and his youngest brother, Joseph Edward Gallo. Joseph Gallo, Sr. died in a murder-suicide when he shot his wife and then took his own life. Julio grew up near Modesto, California and graduated in 1929 from Modesto High School. He married Aileen (1913–1999) and they had: Robert J. Gallo, and Susan Gallo Coleman.

He died on May 2, 1993, when the vehicle he was driving veered off a dirt road on his ranch near Tracy, California. The cause of death was a cervical spine fracture and partial dislocation caused by the blunt-force trauma of the crash.

Awards and honors
1989 – Golden Plate Award of the American Academy of Achievement
2006 – Hospitality Industry Hall of Honor, Conrad N. Hilton College, Hilton University of Houston

Further reading
Gallo Family Vineyards 
Henderson, Bruce, with Ernest and Julio Gallo. Ernest & Julio: Our Story. Times Books, 1994

References

1910 births
1993 deaths
American people of Italian descent
Wine merchants
20th-century American businesspeople
Gallo family
Road incident deaths in California